Blue Cave or In Blue Cave is the seventh studio album by Australian rock group Hoodoo Gurus. The album was released in May 1996 and peaked at number 18 on the ARIA charts.

At the ARIA Music Awards of 1996, the album was nominated for ARIA Award for Best Pop Release. 

EMI re-released the album on 6 February 2005 with six additional tracks, a fold out poster and liner notes by Charles Fisher, the record producer.

Track listing

Personnel 
Credits:
 Dave Faulkner – lead vocals (except track 9), guitar, keyboards
 Richard Grossman – bass guitar, backing vocals
 Mark Kingsmill – drums
 Brad Shepherd – guitar, harmonica, backing vocals, lead vocals (track 9)
 Engineer – Paul McKercher
 Assistant engineer – Robin Gist
 Mastering – Bob Ludwig
 Mixer – Kevin Shirley
 Assistant mixer – Louis Mitchell
 Producers – Charles Fisher, Hoodoo Gurus

Charts

Certifications

More Electric Soup video 
"More Electric Soup" was a VHS video that accompanied a limited release of "Blue Cave" in a unique gatefold picture box. It included the eight music videos that had been made by the band since the 1992 video compilation, Electric Soup, excluding "Turn Up Your Radio" with Masters Apprentices. "Spahn Ranch" was the only inclusion not to be released as a single. "Down on Me" was the only Blue Cave single not to appear on the compilation, as it was released the following year.

 "Waking Up Tired" (music video directed by John Whitteron)
 "If Only" (music video directed by John Whitteron)
 "Big Deal" (music video directed by John Whitteron)
 "The Right Time" (music video directed by Jonathan Ogilvie)
 "You Open My Eyes" (music video directed by Kimble Rendall)
 "Less Than A Feeling" (music video directed by John Whitteron)
 "Nobody" (music video directed by Jonathan Ogilvie)
 "Spahn Ranch" (music video directed by John Whitteron)

References 

Hoodoo Gurus albums
Zoo Entertainment (record label) albums
1996 albums